This is a list of episodes from the Family Jr. television series Justin Time. Initially stories aired as individual quarter-hour segments, but were also paired up together to compose half-hour episodes.

Series overview

Episodes

Season 1 (2011)

Season 2

Season 3 (Justin Time Go!)

References

Lists of Canadian children's animated television series episodes